Le Noirmont railway station is a railway station in the municipality of Le Noirmont, in the Swiss canton of Jura. It is located at the junction of the  La Chaux-de-Fonds–Glovelier and Tavannes–Noirmont lines of the Chemins de fer du Jura.

Services 
 the following services stop at Le Noirmont:

 Regio:
 hourly service to

References

External links 
 
 

Railway stations in the canton of Jura
Chemins de fer du Jura stations